H. metallica may refer to:
 Harrisina metallica, the Western grapeleaf skeletonizer, a moth species found in the South-western parts of the United States
 Hyposmocoma metallica, a moth species endemic to Hawaii

Synonyms
 Hedydipna metallica, a synonym for Anthreptes metallicus, the Nile Valley sunbird, a bird species found in Djibouti, Egypt, Eritrea, Ethiopia, Oman, Saudi Arabia, Somalia, Sudan and Yemen

See also
 Metallica (disambiguation)